Anton may refer to:

People 
Anton (given name), including a list of people with the given name
Anton (surname)

Places 
Anton Municipality, Bulgaria
Anton, Sofia Province, a village
Antón District, Panama
Antón, a town and capital of the district
Anton, Colorado, an unincorporated town
Anton, Texas, a city
Anton, Wisconsin, an unincorporated community
River Anton, Hampshire, United Kingdom

Other uses 
Case Anton, codename for the German and Italian occupation of Vichy France in 1942
Anton (computer), a highly parallel supercomputer for molecular dynamics simulations
Anton (1973 film), a Norwegian film
Anton (2008 film), an Irish film
Anton Cup, the championship trophy of the Swedish junior hockey league J20 SuperElit